Frederick Arnold McNeill (May 6, 1952 – November 3, 2015) was an American professional football player who was a linebacker for the Minnesota Vikings of the National Football League (NFL) for 12 seasons from 1974-1985. He played college football for the UCLA Bruins. In 1973, he was named to the All-Coast/Conference First-team. McNeil was selected by the Vikings in the first round of the 1974 NFL Draft with the 17th overall selection. He was the first person to have been diagnosed with CTE while alive and have it confirmed following his death.

Professional career
He played on defenses that led the NFC in fewest points allowed in 1976 and the NFL in fewest total yards allowed in 1975 and fewest passing yards allowed in 1976.

McNeill appeared in 2 Super Bowls with the Vikings, Super Bowl IX and Super Bowl XI. McNeill blocked a punt in Super Bowl XI.

Later years
During his last campaign with the Vikings, he began his studies at the William Mitchell College of Law, where he graduated at the top of his class.  He eventually became a partner with a Minneapolis, Minnesota area law firm following his NFL career.

McNeill was voted into the UCLA Athletics Hall of Fame in 2012.

In his later years he was diagnosed with dementia, and was  formally diagnosed with  chronic traumatic encephalopathy (CTE) in 2009. In March 2014 he received a diagnosis of amyotrophic lateral sclerosis (Lou Gehrig's Disease). He died of ALS on November 3, 2015 at the age of 63.  Following his death Doctor Bennet Omalu conducted an autopsy on McNeil and confirmed the CTE diagnosis.

Personal life
McNeill was married to Tia McNeill and they had two sons, Fred Jr. and Gavin. McNeill was the unnamed individual in a study published online in the journal Neurosurgery, where evidence of CTE was observed during scans while he was still alive and confirmed during an autopsy following his death. These results may help in detecting CTE in living individuals and help to improve understanding and treatment.

References

External links

Sportspeople from Durham, North Carolina
American football linebackers
UCLA Bruins football players
Minnesota Vikings players
1952 births
2015 deaths
Neurological disease deaths in California
Deaths from motor neuron disease
20th-century American lawyers